There have been two baronetcies created for persons with the surname Hobart, one in England and one in the United Kingdom.

The Hobart Baronetcy, of Intwood in the County of Norfolk, was created in the Baronetage of England in 1611 for Sir Henry Hobart. The fifth Baronet was created Earl of Buckinghamshire in 1746. For more information on this creation, see the latter title.

The Hobart Baronetcy, of Langdown in the County of Southampton, was created in the Baronetage of the United Kingdom in 1914 for Sir Robert Henry Hobart, who had previously served as Liberal MP for New Forest from 1906 to 1910. Hobart was the son of the Very Reverend the Hon. Henry Lewis Hobart, fourth son of the third Earl of Buckinghamshire. The present holder is heir presumptive to the earldom of Buckinghamshire and the 1611 baronetcy.

Hobart baronets, of Intwood (1611)
see the Earl of Buckinghamshire

Hobart baronets, of Langdown (1914)
Sir Robert Henry Hobart, 1st Baronet (1836–1928)
Sir Claud Vere Cavendish Hobart, 2nd Baronet (1870–1949)
Sir Robert Hampden Hobart, 3rd Baronet (1915–1988)
Sir John Vere Hobart, 4th Baronet (born 1945)

References

Kidd, Charles, Williamson, David (editors). Debrett's Peerage and Baronetage (1990 edition). New York: St Martin's Press, 1990.

 

Baronetcies in the Baronetage of England
Baronetcies in the Baronetage of the United Kingdom
1611 establishments in England
1914 establishments in the United Kingdom
Hobart family